Melisa croceipes is a moth of the family Erebidae. It was described by Per Olof Christopher Aurivillius in 1892 and is found in Cameroon, the Democratic Republic of the Congo, Equatorial Guinea and Ghana.

References

 Arctiidae genus list at Butterflies and Moths of the World of the Natural History Museum

Syntomini
Moths described in 1892
Erebid moths of Africa